The discography of contemporary Christian singer Crystal Lewis consists of sixteen studio albums, two live albums, twenty-five singles, two Christmas albums, one EP, two band albums, one remix album, eight Spanish albums and four compilation albums.

Her most recent albums include: Crystal Lewis (2015), the Spanish version of her eponymous album titled Suéltalo (2017) and Rhapsody (2019). In 2022, the single "I Can't Help It" was released from her newest album, Together We Can.

Studio albums

Live albums

EPs

Christmas albums

Remix albums

Spanish albums

Band albums

Compilation albums

DVDs and videos

Singles 
1988: "You Didn't Have to Do It" 
1992: "I Now Live" 
1993: "The Mother & The Bride" 
1995: "Come Just As You Are" 
1995: "Shine Jesus Shine" (No. 1 CCM Dance)
1996: "People Get Ready...Jesus Is Comin'" (No. 1 CCM)
1996: "Beauty for Ashes" (No.  1 CCM)
1996: "The Beauty of the Cross" (No. 1 CCM)
1996: "God's Been Good To Me" (No. 1 CCM)
1996: "Lion and the Lamb" 
1998: "Not the Same" (No. 1 CCM)
1998: "Lord I Believe in You" (No. 1 CCM)
1998: "Be With Him" 
1999: "Lean on Me" / "Dyer Rd." 
2000: "Only Fools" 
2000: "Satisfied" 
2000: "Trust Me" 
2001: "Like a Child" 
2001: "When God's People Pray" 
2002: "His Eye Is on the Sparrow" 
2002: "The Wisdom of Tenderness" 
2005: "Learn to Fly" 
2005: "Just Sing" 
2022: "I Can't Help It"

Music videos 
1992: "I Now Live (Remix)" featuring Peace 586 (aka MC Peace)
1996: "The Beauty of the Cross" 
1996: "Beauty for Ashes" featuring Ron Kenoly
1996: "Esplendor Por Ceniza" featuring Marcos Witt
1998: "Lord, I Believe in You" (Remix)
1998: "Cristo Yo Creo En Ti" (Remix)
1998: "Lean on Me" features Kirk Franklin with Mary J. Blige, R. Kelly, Bono & Lewis
2000: "Trust Me" 
2001: "More" 
2002: "His Eye Is on the Sparrow" 
2003: "Be the Light"
2015: "Love Each Other"
2015: "Faithful"
2017: "BLOOM"

References

Discographies of American artists
Lewis, Crystal

pt:Crystal Lewis